Turkey has competed in every IAAF World Championships in Athletics since the event's first edition in 1983.

Medalists

Source:

Summary

Doping disqualifications

See also 
 Turkey at the European Athletics Championships

References 

 
Nations at the World Athletics Championships
Athletics in Turkey